Stephen Edwards (born 24 May 1969) is a British former alpine skier. He competed in the slalom at the 1992 Winter Olympics, but did not finish.

References

1969 births
Living people
British male alpine skiers
Olympic alpine skiers of Great Britain
Alpine skiers at the 1992 Winter Olympics
Place of birth missing (living people)